Loch Ryan was a  heavy lift cargo liner which was built by Furness Shipbuilding Ltd, Haverton Hill-on-Tees in 1943 as Empire Chieftain for the Ministry of War Transport (MoWT). In 1946 she was sold to Royal Mail Lines and renamed Loch Ryan. She served until 1960, when she was sold to Argonaut Shipping & Trading Co Ltd and was renamed Fair Ryan, being scrapped later that year.

Description
The ship was built by Furness Shipbuilding Ltd, Haverton Hill-on-Tees, as yard number 354. She was launched on 20 May 1943, and completed in October 1943.

She had a GRT of 9,904 and a NRT of 7,155.

The ship was propelled by two steam turbines, double reduction geared, driving a screw propeller. The turbines were made by Richardsons, Westgarth & Co Ltd, Hartlepool.

History
Empire Chieftain was built for the MoWT. The United Kingdom Official Number 164863 and the Code Letters BFKL were allocated. Her port of registry was Middlesbrough. She was placed under the management of Royal Mail Lines.

Empire Chieftain was a member of a number of convoys during the Second World War.

CU 57
Convoy CU 57 departed New York on 5 February 1945 and arrived at Liverpool on  14 February. Empire Chieftain joined the convoy at sea.

In 1946, Empire Chieftain was sold to Royal Mail Lines and was renamed Loch Ryan. She served until 1960. On 1 January 1960, she was sold to Argonaut Shipping & Trading Co Ltd, London and was renamed Fair Ryan for the voyage to the shipbreakers. She arrived on 2 July 1960 at Nagasaki, Japan for scrapping.

References

External links
Photo of Empire Chieftain

1943 ships
Ships built on the River Tees
Empire ships
Ministry of War Transport ships
Cargo liners
Steamships of the United Kingdom
Merchant ships of the United Kingdom